HD 41004 Ab is an extrasolar planet approximately 139 light years away in the constellation of Pictor. It has mass 2.56 MJ planet orbiting at a distance of 1.70 AU from HD 41004 A. The planet's orbit is highly eccentric caused by the companion star HD 41004 B and the distance ranges from 0.44 to 2.96 astronomical units.

References

External links 
 

Pictor (constellation)
Giant planets
Exoplanets discovered in 2003
Exoplanets detected by radial velocity